D'Anthony is a given name. Notable people with this name include the following: 

D'Anthony Batiste (born 1982), American football player
D'Anthony Bell (born 1996), American football player
D'Anthony Smith (born 1988), American football player

See also
Les Aventures d'Anthony, 2015 Chinese film

De'Anthony
Dee Anthony